Sir Edward Bray (c. 1519–1581), was an English politician.

He was a Member (MP) of the Parliament of England for Helston in 1571.
He was the son of Sir Edward Bray

References

1519 births
1581 deaths
Members of the pre-1707 English Parliament for constituencies in Cornwall
English MPs 1571